This is a list of notable Spiritualist organizations:

Agasha Temple of Wisdom
Arthur Findlay College
Camp Chesterfield
International Spiritualist Federation
National Spiritualist Association of Churches
Spiritualist Association of Great Britain
Spiritualists' National Union

External links
 Spiritualist Churches, Spiritualist.tv
 Spiritualist churches in the East Midlands district of the Spiritualists' National Union
 
 Historical and contemporary international list of Spiritualist Organizations, Associations, and Camps
  The New Christian Spiritualists' Society Website

Organizations
Lists of organizations